Elmer Lucille Allen (born in Louisville, Kentucky, August 24, 1931) is a ceramic artist and chemist who graduated from Nazareth College (now Spalding University) in 1953. She became the first African-American chemist at Brown-Forman in 1966.

Early life
Allen was born in the Depression era in Louisville, Kentucky, at a time when it was still a segregated city. She took her first art class, a sewing class, in seventh grade at Madison Street Junior High School. She stated in an interview that the first artist she identified with was her teacher, Ms. Hattie Figg, who taught painting at the junior high. She learned many functional crafts in junior high, such as shoe repair, printing, sewing, and carpentry. She also learned various crafts at the Plymouth Settlement House and Presbyterian Community Center. She was also a Girl Scout, and this activity fostered her interest in art. She graduated from Central High School in 1949, at a time when African-American women had very few opportunities available to them.

Later career
Allen retired from Brown-Forman in 1997, after which she devoted more time to her art. Starting in 1981 she began to study art at the University of Louisville, receiving her Masters of Creative Arts with a focus in ceramics and fiber in 2002. Allen's textile work incorporates shibori dyeing techniques.

Speaking of her ceramics, Allen states, "I make the things that I want, and I have always liked teapots." She enjoys the fact that if she made something she did not like, she could simply start over again. Her platters are typically dark and molten, while her teapots are colorful and graphic. She states, "When I rented my first studio in 2005 at Mellwood, I knew that I was truly an artist."

In 2011 Allen's work was included in the show Powering Creativity: Air, Fuel, Heat at the Carnegie Center for Art and History in New Albany, Indiana.

Allen's work was part of the 2016 Women's Artist Exhibition: The African Heritage Experience at the Kentucky Center for African American Heritage.

Awards
 1986 – Governor's Award in the Arts (Kentucky)
2004—Kentucky’s Community Arts Lifetime Local Achievement Award 
2004—Woman of Distinction
2007 -- "Women of Spunk" from Actors Theatre
 2011 – Caritas Medal Spalding University
 2015 – Kentucky Museum of Art and Craft's Art Advocacy Award
2015—Community Spirit Award given by the University of Louisville College of Arts and Science and the Yearlings Club
2016—Parkland Rising Up Project
2016 -- Louisville Defender – Lifetime Community Service Recognition Award
2016—Outstanding Community Leader by Metro Council
2019 -- Louisville Free Public Library’s Pillars of Louisville

References

1931 births
Living people
African-American chemists
American textile artists
American women ceramists
American ceramists
Artists from Louisville, Kentucky
Spalding University alumni
University of Louisville alumni
American women chemists
Central High School (Louisville, Kentucky) alumni
Brown–Forman people
Women textile artists
21st-century American women artists
21st-century ceramists
21st-century African-American women
21st-century African-American artists
20th-century African-American people
20th-century African-American women